Peperomia yananoensis is a species of plant from the genus Peperomia. It was discovered by William Trelease in Peru, 1926. It has an elevation of 1800 meters.

References

yananoensis
Flora of South America
Plants described in 1926
Taxa named by William Trelease